Iqbal Raad was a prominent Pakistani lawyer associated with the Pakistan Muslim League (N). He had been Advocate General of Sindh until 1999. In 2000 he was one of the lead defense lawyers in the trial of ousted Pakistani prime minister Nawaz Sharif. On 10 March 2000 he was killed in his office in Karachi by three gunmen, while a fourth stood guard at the entrance to the building. He was 52 years old at the time of his death. In 2005, ten Muttahida Qaumi Movement activists were acquitted of the murder.

References

External links
http://www.gettyimages.com/detail/news-photo/the-body-of-iqbal-raad-lawyer-for-deposed-pakistani-prime-news-photo/1593193
http://www.gettyimages.com/detail/news-photo/family-members-mourn-the-death-of-iqbal-raad-lawyer-for-news-photo/1508806

Pakistani lawyers
2000 deaths
Year of birth missing
Assassinated Pakistani people